The Members of Parliament (Remuneration) Act 1980, is a Malaysian law which was enacted to provide for the remuneration of Members of Parliament and for other matters incidental thereto or connected therewith.

Structure
The Members of Parliament (Remuneration) Act 1980, in its current form (1 January 2006), consists of only 14 sections and 2 schedules (including 19 amendments), without separate Parts.
 Section 1: Short title
 Section 2: Interpretation
 Section 3: Remuneration of Members of Parliament
 Section 4: Remuneration of President of Senate, Speaker, etc.
 Section 5: Other allowances and privileges for persons under sections 3 and 4
 Section 6: Remuneration of Members of the Administration
 Section 7: Commencement of salaries and allowances
 Section 8: Pensions and gratuities
 Section 9: Accident benefits
 Section 10: Reduction of allowances by Parliament
 Section 11: Provision against duplicate salaries
 Section 12: Moneys to be provided or charged
 Section 13: Repeal and savings
 Section 14: Repeal
 Schedules

References

External links
 Members of Parliament (Remuneration) Act 1980 

1980 in Malaysian law
Malaysian federal legislation